Susannah Kaul (born 20 April 1999) is an Estonian Paralympic swimmer who competes at international elite competitions. She is a World bronze medalist and a European silver medalist in freestyle swimming and has qualified for the 2020 Summer Paralympics. Her sister Maria Lota Kaul is a professional tennis player.

References

1999 births
Living people
Swimmers from Tallinn
Estonian female freestyle swimmers
Paralympic swimmers of Estonia
Medalists at the World Para Swimming Championships
Medalists at the World Para Swimming European Championships
Swimmers at the 2020 Summer Paralympics
S10-classified Paralympic swimmers
21st-century Estonian women